Christian Rasmussen may refer to:

 Christian Rasmussen (racing driver) (born 2000), Danish race car driver
 Christian Rasmussen (footballer) (born 2003), Danish footballer
 Christian Joseph Rasmussen (1845–1908), Danish composer
 Christian Rasmussen (sailor)